Martin George Southcote Mansergh (born 31 December 1946) is an Irish former Fianna Fáil politician who served as a Minister of State from 2008 to 2011. He served as a Teachta Dála (TD) for the Tipperary South constituency from 2007 to 2011. He was a Senator for the Agricultural Panel from 2002 to 2007.

He played a leading role in developing Fianna Fáil policy on Northern Ireland.

Early and personal life
Mansergh was born on 31 December 1946 in Woking, Surrey, England to Diana Mary (née Keeton) and Professor Nicholas Mansergh OBE, a Tipperary-born Irish historian. Although born in England, Mansergh's forefathers were part of the Anglo-Irish Protestant Ascendancy and arrived in Ireland with Oliver Cromwell. He was raised in England and lived in the Cambridgeshire town of Little Shelford. He was educated at The King's School, Canterbury and Christ Church, Oxford, studying Politics, Philosophy and Economics and obtaining a Doctorate in philosophy for a study of pre-revolutionary French history. Mansergh is a member of the Church of Ireland. He sat on the board of Bolton Library for several years.

Career
He entered the Department of Foreign Affairs, being appointed a Third secretary in 1974 and became a First Secretary in 1977. Later recruited by Taoiseach Charles Haughey, he worked for the Fianna Fáil party thereafter, serving under three Fianna Fáil leaders as Director of Research, Policy and Special Advisor on Northern Ireland where he was involved in discussions between the nationalist parties and the Irish Government and met regularly with intermediary Father Alec Reid.

Mansergh was a key member of the team which formed the Fianna Fáil–Labour Party coalition in 1992 and was also involved in the formation of the Fianna Fáil–Progressive Democrats coalition in 1997. As a senior adviser to successive Taoisigh, Mansergh has played a key role in the Northern Ireland peace process over the last twenty years. He ran for Fianna Fáil as a Dáil candidate in the Tipperary South constituency at the 2002 general election but failed to be elected with 14.2% of the poll. However, Mansergh was elected to the 22nd Seanad by the Agricultural Panel in July of that year. At the 2007 general election he again ran for Fianna Fáil as a Dáil candidate in the Tipperary South constituency, this time being elected with 15.7% of the poll. He was formerly a member of the Irish Council of State.

Until 2006 he wrote a weekly column for The Irish Times, but resigned because of the upcoming general election. In May 2008, he was appointed by the government of Brian Cowen as Minister of State at the Department of Finance with special responsibility for the Office of Public Works and Minister of State at the Department of Arts, Sport and Tourism with special responsibility for the Arts.

In January 2009, he offered to quit his junior ministry post to save money and called on people to retain their Celtic Tiger style optimism and self-respect. He said: "We're not going to get anywhere by completely throwing overboard our self respect. We have achieved a tremendous amount in the past 20 years – they were the best 20 years in our history. There will be cycles – we rose very high and we are where we are now. We have to work our way out of this intelligently". However, he was re-appointed to his positions when Cowen reduced the number of junior ministers from 20 to 15.

He lost his seat at the 2011 general election.

He is vice-chair of the government's Expert Advisory Group on the Decade of Centenaries.

He was elected a member of the Royal Irish Academy in May 2018.

He has been a frequent contributor to The Irish Catholic.

Media image
Mansergh has been a strong supporter of former Taoiseach Bertie Ahern, whose financial affairs were investigated by the Mahon Tribunal. He has been accused by some commentators of being insulting, condescending and petulant to opposition politicians. In February 2008, on the RTÉ Radio 1 show Morning Ireland, Mansergh insisted that Ahern's difficulties were no more than a spot of "inflight turbulence," with a safe landing in sight. When Fine Gael's tribunal expert, Senator Eugene Regan dissented, Mansergh became quite agitated, questioning why Regan wanted to question Ahern's finances declaring to Regan that: "You should have respect for your betters!"

Mansergh is mentioned by name in the TV series, Charlie, where Taoiseach, Charles Haughey, in a conversation with Fr Alec Reid, places him in charge of drawing up a roadmap to peace in Northern Ireland.

Honours and awards
Along with Fr Alec Reid and the Reverend Roy Magee, he was awarded the 1995 Tipperary International Peace Award, now described as "Ireland's outstanding award for humanitarian work". Carlow College awarded its inaugural St. Columbanus Medal in November 2018, to Mansergh, in recognition of his contribution to the peace process in Ireland.

Works
Mansergh, Martin, The Legacy of History for Making Peace in Ireland,

References

External links

2009 Comment on Irish unity 

1946 births
Living people
Alumni of Christ Church, Oxford
Fianna Fáil TDs
Historians of Europe
Irish Anglicans
Irish civil servants
Irish columnists
20th-century Irish historians
21st-century Irish historians
Members of the 22nd Seanad
Members of the 30th Dáil
Members of the Royal Irish Academy
Ministers of State of the 30th Dáil
Presidential appointees to the Council of State (Ireland)
The Irish Times people
Revisionism (Ireland)
Fianna Fáil senators
People from Woking
People from Little Shelford